Regional elections were held in France on 20 June and 27 June 2021. At stake were the regional councils in metropolitan and overseas France including the Corsican Assembly, Assembly of French Guiana and Assembly of Martinique, all for a six-year term. The Departmental Council of Mayotte, which also exercises the powers of a region, also participated in this election, because the departmental elections were held at the same time. Eighteen regional presidencies were at stake, with thirteen in mainland France and Corsica, as well as five overseas. Though they do not have legislative autonomy, these territorial collectivities manage sizable budgets. Moreover, regional elections are often perceived as a mid-term opinion poll. Due to the COVID-19 pandemic, the regional and departmental elections were postponed, first to 13 and 20 June 2021 and then to 20 and 27 June 2021.

Voting system
The regional elections are held in direct universal suffrage using proportional representation lists. The election is held over two rounds, with majority bonus. The lists must be gender balanced by alternatively have a male candidate and a female candidate from the top to the bottom of the list. Only lists with as many candidates as available seats in every department of the region may compete. Before 2004, lists could be presented only at the departement level, allowing smaller parties (notably Hunting, Fishing, Nature, Tradition, Alsace d'abord, Lutte Ouvrière, Revolutionary Communist League) to be represented as such in the regional councils and thus forcing major parties to enter into negotiations to rule some regions.

Following the 1999 and 2003 electoral reforms, with a first implementation in 2004, a two-round runoff voting system is used to elect the regional presidents. If no party gets at least 50% of the vote in the first round, a second round is held, which any party who got at least 10% in the first round may enter. Lists that obtain at least 5% of the vote in the first round may merge in the second round with a 'qualified list', which includes candidates from each merged list.

At the decisive round (first round if a list won 50%, the second round if not), the leading list receives a premium of 25% of the seats while the remaining seats are distributed among all lists who received at least 5% of votes. Thus, the majority bonus allows a leading list to have an absolute majority of seats in the Regional Council from one-third of votes in the second round. The seats are distributed among the lists at the regional level but within each list, seats are allocated by departement branch in proportion to the number of votes in each department.

Background
When National Rally MEP Jordan Bardella tweeted criticism of Muslim LREM candidate Sara Zemmahi for wearing a hijab in a campaign poster, Executive Officer of La République En Marche! Stanislas Guerini responded in agreement and Zammahi was barred from running as a LREM candidate. Guerini claimed that "wearing ostentatious religious symbols on a campaign document is not compatible with the values of LREM". This was condemned by fellow LREM deputies Coralie Dubost and Caroline Janvier.

Opinion polls

National results

First round

Second round

By region

Results by region

Auvergne-Rhône-Alpes 
Outgoing president : Laurent Wauquiez (LR)

Bourgogne-Franche-Comté 
Outgoing president : Marie-Guite Dufay (PS)

Brittany 
Outgoing president : Loïg Chesnais-Girard (PS)

Centre-Val de Loire 
Outgoing president : François Bonneau (PS)

Corsica 

Outgoing president of the Executive council : Gilles Simeoni (FC)Outgoing president of the Assembly : Jean-Guy Talamoni (CL)

Grand Est 
Outgoing president : Jean Rottner (LR)

Guadeloupe 
Outgoing president : Ary Chalus (GUSR)

French Guiana 
Outgoing president of the Assembly : Rodolphe Alexandre (GR)

Hauts-de-France 
Outgoing president : Xavier Bertrand (DVD)

Île-de-France 
Outgoing president : Valérie Pécresse (SL)

Martinique 
Outgoing president of the Executive council : Alfred Marie-Jeanne (MIM)Outgoing president of the Assembly : Claude Lise (RDM)

Normandy 
Outgoing president : Hervé Morin (LC)

Nouvelle-Aquitaine 
Outgoing president : Alain Rousset (PS)

Occitanie 
Outgoing president : Carole Delga (PS)

Pays de la Loire 
Outgoing president : Christelle Morançais (LR)

Provence-Alpes-Côte-d'Azur 
Outgoing president : Renaud Muselier (LR)

Réunion 
Outgoing president : Didier Robert (DVD)

Analysis 
All incumbent regional presidents retained their seats. Three of them (Xavier Bertrand of Hauts-de-France, Laurent Wauquiez of Auvergne-Rhône-Alpes and Valérie Pécresse of Île-de-France) were seen in the case of victory as potential contenders of presidential elections of 2022.

Results showed some recovery to the Socialist Party as well (most notably, in Occitanie).

Before the elections, pundits discussed the possibility of the National Rally winning a region (Provence-Alpes-Côte d’Azur), but they failed to do it and underperformed compared to their polling. The party's support dropped in all regions (most notably, in Hauts-de-France).

The La République En Marche failed to win any regional presidency.

References

Regional
Elections in French regions
Regional elections